Cwm railway station served the village of Cwm in Monmouthshire, Wales.

History
The station was originally opened by the Monmouthshire Railway and Canal Company on 19 April 1852. It became part of the Great Western Railway in 1880 and remained there at the Grouping of 1923. The line then passed on to the Western Region of British Railways on nationalisation in 1948. The station was closed to passengers by the British Transport Commission on 30 April 1962, remaining open for goods traffic until 4 November 1963.

Present day

A new station on the Ebbw Valley Railway, which would serve the community of Cwm, South Wales has been proposed.

See also 

 South Wales Metro
 Transport for Wales
 Proposed railway stations in Wales

References

Notes

Sources

External links
Proposals for Cwm station
Archive of Ebbw Valley Railway Scheme website (Blaenau Gwent council, 2008)

Disused railway stations in Blaenau Gwent
Former Great Western Railway stations
Railway stations in Great Britain opened in 1852
Railway stations in Great Britain closed in 1962
Proposed railway stations in Wales
1852 establishments in the United Kingdom
1852 establishments in Wales
1963 disestablishments in Wales